Schwinger parametrization is a technique for evaluating loop integrals which arise from Feynman diagrams with one or more loops.

Using the well-known observation that

Julian Schwinger noticed that one may simplify the integral:

for Re(n)>0.

Another version of Schwinger parametrization is:

It is easy to generalize this identity to n denominators.

See also
 Feynman parametrization

References

Quantum field theory